Comamonas guangdongensis is a Gram-negative, anaerobic, motile bacterium from the genus Comamonas and family Comamonadaceae, which was isolated from subterranean forest sediment in Guangdong Province in China.

References

External links
Type strain of Comamonas guangdongensis at BacDive -  the Bacterial Diversity Metadatabase	

Comamonadaceae
Bacteria described in 2013